Pentafluoride may refer to:

Antimony pentafluoride, SbF5
Arsenic pentafluoride, AsF5
Bismuth pentafluoride, BiF5
Bromine pentafluoride, BrF5
Chlorine pentafluoride, ClF5
Chromium pentafluoride, CrF5
Gold pentafluoride, Au2F10
Iodine pentafluoride, IF5
Iridium pentafluoride, IrF5
Manganese pentafluoride, MnF5 (predicted)
Molybdenum pentafluoride, MoF5
Niobium pentafluoride, NbF5
Nitrogen pentafluoride, NF5 (hypothetical)
Neptunium pentafluoride, NpF5
Osmium pentafluoride, OsF5
Phosphorus pentafluoride, PF5
Platinum pentafluoride, PtF5
Plutonium pentafluoride, PuF5
Protactinium pentafluoride, PaF5
Rhenium pentafluoride, ReF5
Rhodium pentafluoride, RhF5
Ruthenium pentafluoride, RuF5
Tantalum pentafluoride, TaF5
Technetium pentafluoride, TcF5
Tungsten pentafluoride, WF5
Uranium pentafluoride, UF5
Vanadium pentafluoride, VF5

Fluorides